Big Brother 12 is the twelfth season of various versions of Big Brother and may refer to:

 Big Brother 12 (U.S.), the 2010 edition of the U.S. version
 Gran Hermano 12 (Spain), the 2010 edition of the Spanish version
 Big Brother 12 (UK), the 2011 edition of the UK version
 Grande Fratello (season 12), the 2011-2012 edition of Big Brother in Italy
 Big Brother Brasil 12, the 2012 edition of the Brazil version
 Big Brother (Australian season 12) the 2020 reboot of the Australian version

See also
 Big Brother (franchise)
 Big Brother (disambiguation)